Telegraph Avenue is a novel by Michael Chabon, published on September 11, 2012. An extensive excerpt from the enhanced e-book edition was released online on July 25, 2012. The novel's setting is North Oakland and Berkeley, California.  The title refers to Telegraph Avenue, which runs through both cities.

Plot
Set in 2004, Archy Stallings, who is black, and Nat Jaffe, who is Jewish, are proprietors of Brokeland Records, a record shop located in north Oakland for twelve years.  Their used vinyl business is threatened by ex-NFL superstar Gibson Goode's planned construction of his second Dogpile Thang megastore two blocks away.  They feel betrayed because their local city councilman, Chandler Flowers, has switched sides, and now supports Dogpile.

A subplot concerns their wives, Gwen Shanks and Aviva Roth-Jaffe, who are partners in Berkeley Birth Partners, a midwifery business.  A home birth goes wrong, the mother is rushed to the hospital, and the attending physician, after taking care of the mother, insults Gwen in a racially tinged manner.  She blows up, and the doctor has the hospital start procedures to drop Gwen and Aviva's hospital privileges.

Another storyline concerns Luther Stallings, Archy's father, an actor in blaxploitation films in the 70s. He was never a part of Archy's life, and Archy wants nothing to do with him.  Luther has been in and out of jail and on and off drugs since his acting career ended, has been clean for over a year, and he keeps himself trim.  He is involved with his former co-star Valetta Moore.

Luther had been best friends with Chandler in the old days.  Their friendship came to an end, after Luther abetted Chandler in the murder of a drug dealer.  Luther is trying to exploit his knowledge in order to finance the making of a film.

Another storyline concerns Julius Jaffe, Nat and Aviva's 14-year-old son, and his new best buddy, Titus Joyner, who has shown up from Texas after his grandmother died.  Titus, it turns out, is Archy's long lost son.  His arrival is the last straw in Gwen's relationship with Archy.

Setting up a gig for a fundraiser for an Illinois politician, Barack Obama, running for U.S. Senate, Archy learns of the death of Cochise Jones, Archy's spiritual father, and Archy fills in.  Obama is impressed with the performance, and tells Gwen he admires Archy's dedication to doing what he loves.  Gwen takes those words to heart, and resolves to stand up for herself.  The first stand she takes is to walk out on Archy.

The funeral for Jones is held in the store.  Plans are made, people get drunk, and the stage is set for shaking up everyone's future.

Music referenced in the novel
 Page 3: Electric Byrd (Blue Note, 1970) by Donald Byrd
 Page 4: Wa-Tu-Wa-Zui (Prestige, 1971) by Charles Kynard
 Page 4: Fingers (CTI, 1972) by Airto Moreira
 Page 7: After Dark (RSO, 1980) by Andy Gibb
 Page 9: Kulu Sé Mama (Impulse!, 1967) by John Coltrane
 Page 9: On the Corner (Columbia, 1972) by Miles Davis
 Page 31: Jimmy Smith Live in Israel (Isradisc, 1973) by Jimmy Smith
 Page 34: Stan Getz and J.J. Johnson at the Opera House (Verve, 1957) by Stan Getz and J.J. Johnson
 Page 41: The Soul Vibrations of Man (Saturn Research, 1976) by Sun Ra
 Page 86: Innervisions (Motown, 1973) by Stevie Wonder
 Page 86: Point of Know Return (Kirshner, 1977) by Kansas
 Page 87: Brain Salad Surgery (Manticore, 1973) by Emerson Lake & Palmer
 Page 90: Close to the Edge (Atlantic, 1972) by Yes
 Page 110: “Be Thankful for What You Got” (Roxbury, 1973) by William DeVaughn
 Page 157: “Funky Drummer” (King, 1970) by James Brown
 Page 194: In a Silent Way (Columbia, 1969) by Miles Davis
 Page 226: “Midnight Theme” (Fraternity, 1975) by Manzel
 Page 273: Melting Pot (Stax, 1971) by Booker T. & the MG’s
 Page 274: “Live on Stage” (Breakout, 1980) by Roxanne Shanté
 Page 370: “It’s Too Late” (Ode Records, 1971) by Carole King
 Page 414: “A Love Supreme” (Impulse, 1965) by John Coltrane

Marketing

As part of the book's marketing, HarperCollins created a real-world Brokeland Records as a pop-up store.  To coincide with the book launch, an independent Oakland bookstore was, for one week, September 7–14, 2012, made over into a used jazz record store, using stock from an independent dealer.  In addition to the new signage and stock, "Brokeland Records" bags and other paraphernalia were provided.

Reception

References

2012 American novels
Novels by Michael Chabon
Novels set in Oakland, California
HarperCollins books
Novels about music
Fiction set in 2004